Untold Stories is a fourth album by the progressive bluegrass band Hot Rize.

Track listing
 Are You Tired of Me, My Darling? (trad.) 2:05
 Untold Stories (O'Brien) 2:46
 Just Like You (Wernick) 3:35
 Country Blues (trad.) 2:32
 Bluegrass Part 3 (O'Brien) 2:39
 Won't You Come and Sing for Me (Dickens) 3:03
 Life's Too Short (Delmore) 3:11
 You Don't Have to Move the Mountain (Whitley) 3:03
 Shadows in My Room (Forster) 2:45
 Don't Make Me Believe (3:11)
 Wild Ride (1:58)
 Late in the Day (O'Brien) 3:58

Personnel
 Nick Forster - bass, vocals
 Tim O'Brien - vocals, mandolin, violin
 Pete Wernick - banjo, vocals
 Charles Sawtelle - guitar, vocals
 Jerry Douglas - dobro

References

External links
Official site

1987 albums
Hot Rize albums